Holland Junior/Senior High School is a public high school located in the Town of Holland, Erie County, New York, U.S.A., and is the only high school operated by the Holland Central School District.

Footnotes

Schools in Erie County, New York
Public high schools in New York (state)